Sulaiman Yahya Hazazi (born 1 February 2003) is a Saudi Arabian professional footballer who plays as a left-back for Saudi Professional League side Al-Taawoun.

Career
Hazazi started his career at the youth team of Al-Wehda and represented the club at every level. He made his debut on 12 February 2021 in the 4–2 win against Al-Faisaly. Following Al-Wehda's relegation, Hazazi left the club. On 10 July 2021, Hazazi signed a three-year contract with Al-Taawoun.

Career statistics

Club

Honours
Saudi Arabia U20
 Arab Cup U-20: 2021

References

External links
 

2003 births
Living people
Sportspeople from Mecca
Saudi Arabian footballers
Association football fullbacks
Saudi Arabia youth international footballers
Saudi Arabia international footballers
Saudi Professional League players
Al-Wehda Club (Mecca) players
Al-Taawoun FC players